James Anderson King (December 4, 1832 – October 16, 1899) was a ship's master who became a politician of the Republic of Hawaii.

Life
James Anderson King was born in Bridge of Allan, Scotland in December 4, 1832.
He arrived in the Kingdom of Hawaii during the 1860s, just after the American Civil War,  and worked as ship's master on merchant vessels. He sailed the Kona Packet on trading voyages to Alaska, Kamchatka, and Japan. 
When Samuel Gardner Wilder arranged to buy the steamship Likelike, King was put in charge.
As Wilder grew his fleet, Captain King was made superintendent of all shipping operations.
He married Charlotte Holmes Davis, daughter of Robert Grimes Davis. She was the great-granddaughter of Oliver Holmes, an early settler and Governor of Oahu, who had married into Hawaiian nobility. Her uncle William Heath Davis  (1822–1909) moved to Alta California in the 1830s.

After the overthrow of the Kingdom of Hawaii, King was made minister of the interior for the Provisional Government of Hawaii on January 17, 1893. He also served as minister of Interior of the Republic of Hawaii until his death.
On June 3, 1896 he acted as minister of finance until the end of the month when he was replaced by  Henry E. Cooper.

King died October 16, 1899, while trying to teach his six-year-old son how to swim in the ocean.
He had an elaborate state funeral at ʻIolani Palace (then known as the executive building) with burial at Oahu Cemetery with Masonic rituals of Freemasonry on October 23, 1899.
His son  Samuel Wilder King became governor of the Territory of Hawaii.

References

1832 births
1899 deaths
19th-century Scottish people
Republic of Hawaii politicians
Republic of Hawaii Interior Ministers
Republic of Hawaii Finance Ministers
Burials at Oahu Cemetery
People associated with the overthrow of the Hawaiian Kingdom